The  Legislative Council of British Columbia was an advisory body created in 1867 to the governor of the "new" Colony of British Columbia, which had been created from the merger of the old Colonies of Vancouver Island and British Columbia (a.k.a. the Mainland Colony, or the Gold Colony).  The new colony, like its predecessors, did not have responsible government, and while its debates and resolutions carried considerable weight, executive power remained in the hands of the governor, who at the time of the council's founding was Frederick Seymour.

There were three groups of members: five senior officials of the colony, who also constituted its executive council, nine magistrates (some of whom, being popular in their districts, had been elevated to that post so as to please Whitehall's intent that there be a more democratic presence in the council), and nine elected members.  The electoral members represented two seats in Victoria, one in Greater Victoria ("Victoria District"), New Westminster, Columbia River and Kootenay, Nanaimo, Yale and Lytton, Lillooet, Cariboo.

Initial composition

At the time of the council's creation, its members were:
Executive council
Arthur N. Birch – colonial secretary
H.P.P. Crease – attorney-general
W.A.G. Young – acting treasurer
Joseph W. Trutch – chief commissioner of lands and works
Wymond Ogilvy Hamley – collector of customs

Magistrates
Thomas L. Wood – acting solicitor-general
Henry Maynard Ball – magistrate, Cariboo West
Chartres Brew – magistrate, New Westminster
C.F. Cornwall – magistrate, Thompson River District
W.G. Cox – magistrate, Cariboo East
W.J. Macdonald – magistrate, Victoria
C.S. Nicol – magistrate, Nanaimo
Peter O'Reilly – magistrate, Kootenay
E.H. Sanders – magistrate, Yale and Lytton

Elected members
Amor de Cosmos – Victoria
J.S. Helmcken – Victoria
Joseph D. Pemberton – Victoria
John Robson – New Westminster
R.T. Smith – Columbia River and Kootenay 
J.J. Southgate – Nanaimo
Edward Stamp – Lillooet
G.A. Walkem – Cariboo
George Wallace – Yale and Lytton

Elected members were actually appointed by the governor and not mandated by their election, but appointed "in deference to the wishes of the people".  George Wallace, the representative for Yale and Lytton, resigned his seat before the first session and a by-election was held which selected F.J. Barnard as his replacement.  All members, including elected ones, had the right to use "the Honourable" before their name.

Other members included:

 George Phillippo

The council was abolished in 1871 when British Columbia became a province.

See also

United Colonies of Vancouver Island and British Columbia
Executive Council of British Columbia
Legislative Assembly of British Columbia

References

British Columbia Chronicle 1847-1871: Gold and Colonists by G.P.V. Akrigg and Helen B. Akrigg, Discovery Press, Vancouver, 1977 (pp. 340–341)

History of British Columbia
Political history of British Columbia
Pre-Confederation British Columbia
1867 establishments in the British Empire
British Columbia